The Stadtkirche Darmstadt is the main Protestant church of the city of Darmstadt and one of its parish churches, but no longer the bishopric seat of the local Evangelische Kirche in Hessen und Nassau, which is the Pauluskirche in Darmstadt.

It is the oldest church in the original city. Originally dedicated to the Virgin Mary, the actual view is the one after reconstruction following WW II.

Location 
The Fürstengruft in the crypt contains the  graves of the reigning family of Hessen-Darmstadt. Additional graves can be seen inside the church. A graveyard around the church however is no longer existent.

Tales 

Originally a tunnel may have connected the crypt and the palace. However, only a small tunnel actually remains.

History 

The church was first mentioned in the 12th century. However all parts remaining date from the 17th century or later. 
Until 1929 it contained a princely seat dated 1844 which was removed that year.  Air raids in 1943 and 1944 damaged the church considerably. It was reconstructed 1946–1952.

Monuments 

The church contains various monuments to the ruling family dated 1576 1972. These include:
 Landgraf Georg I. und Landgräfin Magdalena zur Lippe
 Erbprince Philipp Wilhelm – from 1576
 Princess Maria von Braunschweig
 Landgräfin Eleonore von Hessen-Darmstadt
 Prince Georg Wilhelm von Hessen-Darmstadt
 Luise von Preußen – from 1931
 Ludwig von Hessen und bei Rhein – from 1972. he was the last male member of the family

Literature

Jazz

The "Live! Jazz in der Stadtkirche!" series began with the "Round Midnight" series in the summer of 2005, followed by regular spring and autumn jazz concerts and festivals in the church.
The church sees jazz performances as part of its old function as a cultural mediator.
Jazz opens the church to an audience beyond the parish.
In the summer of 2013 the "Round Midnight – Jazz und Gedanken für Nachschwärmer" series in the church included pianist Rainer Böhm and guitarist Norbert Scholly.
In spring of 2014 the "Live! Jazz in der Stadtkirche!" series included the "Live! Ladies of Jazz" program in January–February with performers such as pianist Anke Helfrich.
Between September and December 2014 performers in this series included the drummer Billy Hart, pianist Michael Wollny and accordionist Vincent Peirani.

References

Sources

Churches in Darmstadt